Laksana Kamruen (born March 15, 1986), simply known as Lak, is a Thai professional footballer who plays as an right-back and interim manager for Thai League 1 club Sukhothai.

References

External links
 Profile at Goal
 https://us.soccerway.com/players/laksana-kamruen/287565/

1986 births
Living people
Laksana Kamruen
Laksana Kamruen
Association football defenders
Laksana Kamruen
Laksana Kamruen
Laksana Kamruen
Laksana Kamruen
Laksana Kamruen
Laksana Kamruen
Laksana Kamruen